Pápateszér is a village in Veszprém county, Hungary.

Etymology 
The name of the village referred to the profession of the villagers and comes from Slavic tesar - a carpenter. Thezar (1292)

References

External links 
 Street map (Hungarian)

Populated places in Veszprém County